Libertarian possibilism was a political current in early-20th-century Spanish anarchism that advocated achieving the anarchist ends of ending the state and capitalism by participation in structures of contemporary parliamentary democracy. The name of the political position appeared for the first time between 1922 and 1923 within the discourse of the Catalan anarcho-syndicalist Salvador Seguí when he said, "We have to intervene in politics in order to take over the positions of the bourgeoisie".

History 
During the autumn of 1931, the "Manifesto of the 30" was published by militants of the anarchist trade union Confederación Nacional del Trabajo (CNT). Among those who signed it there was the CNT General Secretary (1922–1923) Joan Peiro, Ángel Pestaña (CNT General Secretary in 1929) and Juan López Sánchez. They were called  and they were calling for a more moderate political line within the Spanish anarchist movement. In 1932, they established the Syndicalist Party which participated in the 1936 Spanish general election and proceed to be a part of the leftist coalition of parties known as the Popular Front by obtaining two congressmen (Pestaña and Benito Pabon).

In 1938, CNT General Secretary Horacio Prieto proposed that the Iberian Anarchist Federation transforms itself into a Libertarian Socialist Party and that it participates in the national elections.

Precedents and later cases 

Pierre-Joseph Proudhon ran for the French Constituent Assembly in April 1848, but he was not elected, although his name appeared on the ballots in Paris, Lyon, Besançon and Lille. However, Proudhon was successful in the complementary elections of June 4. Catalan politician Francesc Pi i Margall became the principal translator of Proudhon's works into Spanish and later briefly became president of Spain in 1873 while being the leader of the Federal Democratic Republican Party. For prominent anarcho-syndicalist Rudolf Rocker: "The first movement of the Spanish workers was strongly influenced by the ideas of Pi y Margall, leader of the Spanish Federalists and disciple of Proudhon. Pi y Margall was one of the outstanding theorists of his time and had a powerful influence on the development of libertarian ideas in Spain. His political ideas had much in common with those of Richard Price, Joseph Priestly [sic], Thomas Paine, Jefferson, and other representatives of the Anglo-American intelligentsia of the first period. He wanted to limit the power of the state to a minimum and gradually replace it by a Socialist economic order". Pi i Margall was a dedicated theorist in his own right, especially through book-length works such as La reacción y la revolución (Reaction and Revolution, 1855), Las nacionalidades (Nationalities, 1877) and La Federación (The Federation, 1880). On the other hand, Fermín Salvochea was a mayor of the city of Cádiz and a president of the province of Cádiz. He was one of the main propagators of anarchist thought in that area in the late 19th century and is considered to be "perhaps the most beloved figure in the Spanish Anarchist movement of the 19th century".<ref name=bookchin>Bookchin, Murray (1998). The Spanish Anarchists. pp. 111–114</ref>

In November 1936, the Popular Front government appointed the prominent anarcha-feminist Federica Montseny as Ministry of Health. In doing so, she became the first woman in Spanish history to be a cabinet minister. When the Republican forces lost the Spanish Civil War, the city of Madrid was turned over to the Francoist forces in 1939 by the last non-Francoist mayor of the city, anarchist Melchor Rodríguez García.

In 1950, a clandestine group formed within the francophone Anarchist Federation (FA) called  (OPB) led by the platformist George Fontenis. The OPB pushed for a move which saw the FA change its name into the Fédération Communiste Libertaire (FCL) after the 1953 Congress in Paris while an article in Le Libertaire indicated the end of the cooperation with the French Surrealist Group led by André Breton. The new decision making process was founded on unanimity as each person has a right of veto on the orientations of the federation. The FCL published the same year the Manifeste du communisme libertaire. Several groups quit the FCL in December 1955, disagreeing with the decision to present "revolutionary candidates" to the legislative elections. On 15–20 August 1954, the Ve intercontinental plenum of the CNT took place. A group called Entente anarchiste appeared which was formed of militants who did not like the new ideological orientation that the OPB was giving the FCL, seeing it was authoritarian and almost Marxist. The FCL lasted until 1956 just after it participated in state legislative elections with tem candidates. This move alienated some members of the FCL and thus produced the end of the organization.

 See also 
 Anarchism in Spain
 Impossibilism
 Libertarian socialism within the labour movement and parliamentary politics
 Possibilism
 Reformist socialism

 References 

 Further reading 
 Israël Renof, Possibilisme libertaire, Noir et Rouge, n°41, mai 1968, pp. 16–23.
 Freddy Gomez, César M. Lorenzo – Le mouvement anarchiste en Espagne, Le Monde libertaire, 14–20 septembre 2006, lire en ligne.
 Horacio Martínez Prieto, Posibilismo libertario, Ivry-sur-Seine, 1966, in Burnett Bolloten, Elisabeth Scheidel-Buchet, La Révolution espagnole : la gauche et la lutte pour le pouvoir, Ruedo Ibérico, 1977, page 535.
 Jesús Ruiz Pérez, Fundamentos ideológicos del posibilismo libertario bajo la II República : las razones de Félix Morga, Alcalde de Nájera, "comunista y libertario", Brocar, Cuadernos de investigación histórica, nº 25, Université de La Rioja, 2001, pp. 163–178, janvier 2001, lire en ligne.
 Jesús Ruiz, Posibilismo libertario – Féliz Morga, Alcalde de Nájera (1891–), Ayuntamiento de Nájera, La Rioja, 2003, .
 Chema Berro Berriozar, « Posibilismo es tensión » : reflexiones en torno al posibilismo y el maximalismo, Polémica, mai 2006, lire en ligne.
 Benjamín Lajo Cosido, ¿Posibilismo libertario?, Fundación Andreu Nin, avril 2007, lire en ligne.
 Jesús Díaz Herrera, El Liderazgo Político de Ángel Pestaña – De la ortodoxia anarquista al Posibilismo Libertario'', Descontrol Editorial, 2015, .

External links 
 Manifestoes of the Sindicalist Party in spanish

Anarchist theory
Anarchism in Spain
Politics of Spain
Spanish Civil War
Libertarian socialism